Mariya Pavlovna Barabanova (November 3, 1911 in Saint Petersburg – March 7, 1993 in Moscow) was a Soviet and Russian stage and film actress. People's Artist of the RSFSR (1991).

Filmography

 Late for a Date (1936) – Mail delivery girl
The New Moscow (1938) – Olya
 Vasilisa the Beautiful (1939) – Bell-ringer
Doctor Kalyuzhnyy (1939) – Yevgraf Timofeyevich
 We from the Urals (1943) – Kapa Khorkova
The Russian Question (1947) – Meg
Town People (1975) – Lady in queue
Finist, the brave Falcon (1975) – Nenila, jolly-old lady
How Ivanushka the Fool Travelled in Search of Wonder (1977) – Baba Yaga
 About the Little Red Riding Hood (1977) – 2nd Evil old lady
The Nightingale (1979) – Dishwasher
Sailors Have No Questions (1980) – Passerby
 The Donkey's Hide (1982) – Blind old lady
Secret of the Blackbirds (1983) – Mrs. Mackenzie
Snake Catcher (1985) – Shop spy
After the Rain, on Thursday (1985) – First nanny
The Tale about the Painter in Love (1987) – Baba Yagishna
Defence Counsel Sedov (1988) – Supplicant
Sons of Bitches (1990) – Busygin's mother

Awards

 Honored Artist of the RSFSR (1970)
 People's Artist of the RSFSR (1991)

References

External links

1911 births
1993 deaths
20th-century Russian actresses
Actresses from Saint Petersburg
Communist Party of the Soviet Union members
Honored Artists of the RSFSR
People's Artists of the RSFSR
Russian film actresses
Russian stage actresses
Russian television actresses
Soviet film actresses

Soviet stage actresses
Soviet television actresses
Burials at Novodevichy Cemetery